Route 2, also known as Pitts Memorial Drive  and Peacekeeper's Way, is a  freeway on the Avalon Peninsula of Newfoundland in the Canadian province of Newfoundland and Labrador. The road provides a direct link from the Trans-Canada Highway (TCH) to downtown St. John's, Newfoundland, which was previously accessible only via city streets such as Topsail Road or Kenmount Road (which was part of the TCH until the Outer Ring Road was built). Initially called the Harbour Arterial, construction began in the early 1970s and was completed in 1979. The $52-million project was funded by the federal and provincial governments. It was renamed by the city council in 1984 after local businessman James Stewart Pitt (1847-1914). 

The road bypasses Mount Pearl to the south and then runs parallel to the Waterford River on an embankment/cutting along the Southside Hills. It enters the downtown on a concrete viaduct that carries it over the Waterford River valley and the terminus of the former Newfoundland Railway. At the end of the viaduct, it meets New Gower Street which continues into downtown St. John's.

As a major route into and out of the city, the road is subject to heavy traffic and has had its share of unfortunate incidents  and shutdowns.

Route description

Route 2 begins as Peacekeeper's Way in Conception Bay South (locally known as C.B.S.) at an at-grade intersection with Route 60 (Conception Bay Highway) in the Seal Cove portion of town. It immediately heads northeast as a two-lane Freeway (super-two) to bypass the town along its southern edge while having interchanges with several local roads, including Route 61 (Foxtrap Access Road) and the Manuels Access Road, where Route 2 wides to a divided four-lane as it enters the town of Paradise. The highway now passes through mainly rural areas before following the Mount Pearl-St. John's city at a large interchange with Route 1 (Trans-Canada Highway). Route 2 now becomes Pitts Memorial Drive and passes through Mount Pearl's southernmost neighbourhoods, where it has an interchange with Route 3 (Robert E Howlett Memorial Drive/Goulds Bypass). This interchange is also proposed to be the eventual southern terminus of Route 3A (Team Gushue Highway). Route 2 now fully enters the St. John's city limits as it passes through farmland just north of Goulds for a few kilometres before entering neighbourhoods at an interchange between Route 10 (Bay Bulls Road) and The Parkway (Columbus Drive) in Kilbride. The highway begins following a ridge overlooking the city as it passes through St. John's southernmost neighbourhoods, crossing over Route 11 (Blackhead Road) without an interchange, before crossing the Waterford River along a concrete viaduct and coming to an end at interchange/at-grade intersection between Water Street, Hamilton Avenue, and New Gower Street in downtown.

Exit list
Except for the Conception Bay Highway and Hamilton Avenue intersections, all intersections are grade-separated.

References 

002
Streets in St. John's, Newfoundland and Labrador